Daniel Coupe (1885–1952) was an English professional footballer who played in the Football League for Manchester City as a right back.

Personal life 
Coupe served as a private in the Leicestershire Regiment during the First World War. He was wounded by a mustard gas shell on 2 October 1917 and evacuated to several medical facilities before being transferred to 5th Northern General Hospital, Leicester, where he stayed for the next month. Eventually transported back to the frontline, Coupe suffered a gunshot wound to the left arm on 22 March 1918. After the war, Coupe was discharged in January 1919.

Career statistics

References

1885 births
1954 deaths
Footballers from Worksop
English footballers
Association football fullbacks
Worksop Town F.C. players
Manchester City F.C. players
English Football League players
British Army personnel of World War I
Military personnel from Nottinghamshire
Royal Leicestershire Regiment soldiers